Many games can be played with Go equipment: a supply of white and black stones and a board with 19×19 intersections, other than Go and many more can be played with minor modification.

Games that can be played without modification on the intersections of a 19×19 Go board include:

 Breakthrough, which can be played on just about any board shape one wishes
 Gomoku, Ninuki-renju and its close relative Pente
 Connect6, similar to naughts and crosses (tic-tac-toe), but requires connecting six in a row, and with two stones per move
 Gonnect
 Tanbo
 Capture Go
 Alea evangelii
 Pente

Games that can be played without modification on the intersections of a Go board reduced in size (perhaps by masking the unwanted sections with paper or tape) include:

 Alak, a Go-like game restricted to a single spatial dimension (1×19)
 Five Field Kono (5x5)
 Renju (15×15)
 Philosopher's football (15×19)
 Cinc Camins
 Some games of Gonu
Games that can be played without modification on the squares of a Go board reduced in size include:

 Gess (18×18 squares—no reduction required)
 Crossings (8×8 squares)
 Epaminondas (12×14 squares)
 Lines of Action (8×8 squares)
 Connect Four (most commonly 7×6 squares)
 Seega (game) (5×5, 7×7 or 9×9 squares)
 Four Field Kono
 Reversi and Othello
 Yoté and Choko (game)
 Several Tafl games

It's also possible to use Go equipment as a low-tech interface to Conway's Game of Life; use black stones in the board's squares as 'pixels', and for each generation use white stones to indicate where new cells will be born. Then remove 'dead' black stones, replace the white stones with black ones to complete the new generation, and repeat the process.

See also 

 International Go Federation

 
Abstract strategy games
Game variants